Fulvio Simonini (born 29 March 1961) is a retired Italian football striker.

References

1968 births
Living people
Italian footballers
Atalanta B.C. players
A.S.D. HSL Derthona players
Virtus Bergamo Alzano Seriate 1909 players
A.C. Cesena players
Calcio Padova players
Udinese Calcio players
Reggina 1914 players
Venezia F.C. players
Piacenza Calcio 1919 players
A.C. Trento 1921 players
Association football forwards
Serie A players